Electronic funds transfer at point of sale (EFTPOS) is an electronic payment system involving electronic funds transfers based on the use of payment cards, such as debit or credit cards, at payment terminals located at points of sale. EFTPOS technology was developed during the 1980s. In Australia and New Zealand, it is also the brand name of a specific system used for such payments; these systems are mainly country-specific and do not interconnect. In Singapore, it is known as NETS.

Debit and credit cards are embossed plastic cards complying with ISO/IEC 7810 ID-1 standard. The cards have an embossed bank card number conforming with the ISO/IEC 7812 numbering standard.

History 

EFTPOS technology originated in the United States in 1981 and was rolled out in 1982. Initially, a number of nationwide systems were set up, such as Interlink, which were limited to participating correspondent banking relationships, not being linked to each other. Consumers and merchants were slow to accept it, and there was minimal marketing. As a result, growth and market penetration of EFTPOS was minimal in the US up to the turn of the century.

In a short time, other countries adopted the EFTPOS technology, but these systems too were limited to the national borders. Each country adopted various interbank co-operative models. In Australia, in 1984 Westpac was the first major Australian bank to implement an EFTPOS system, at BP petrol stations. The other major banks implemented EFTPOS systems during 1984, initially with petrol stations. The banks' existing debit and credit cards (but only allowed to access debit accounts) were used in the EFTPOS systems. In 1985, the State Bank of Victoria developed the capacity to host connect individual ATMS and helped create the ATM (Financial) Network.  Banks started to link their EFTPOS systems to provide access for all customers across all EFTPOS devices. Cards issued by all banks could then be used at all EFTPOS terminals nationally, but debit cards issued in other countries could not. Prior to 1986, the Australian banks organised a widespread uniform credit card, called Bankcard, which had been in existence since 1974. There was a dispute between the banks whether Bankcard (or credit cards in general) should be permitted into the proposed EFTPOS system. At that time several banks were actively promoting MasterCard and Visa credit cards. Store cards and proprietary cards were shut out of the new system.

In New Zealand, a trial scheme of EFTPOS began in 1984, with a terminal in a Shell petrol station connected to a bank computer. The Bank of New Zealand started issuing EFTPOS debit cards in 1985, with the first merchant terminals being installed in petrol stations.

First Mobile EFTPOS 
In 1996, mobile EFTPOS arrived, with hotels in Singapore installing systems in 1997 and the first example of a pizza delivery in Singapore accepting Visa card via cellular payment in 1998, which was a collaboration between Signet, Visa, Citi Bank, and Dynamic Data Systems, beginning the rollout of mobile systems in Asia. By 2004, Cellular based Eftpos infrastructure had really taken off, and by 2010, Cellular Eftpos had become the standard for the global market.

Since 2002, the use of EFTPOS has grown significantly, and it has become the standard payment method, displacing the use of cash. Subsequently, networks facilitating the process of money transfer and payment settlement between the consumer and the merchant grew from a small number of nationwide systems to the majority of payment processing transactions. For EFTPOS, USA based systems allow the use of debit cards or credit cards.

Australia 

In Australia, debit and credit cards are the most common non-cash payment methods at “points of sale” (POS) or via ATMs. Not all merchants provide EFTPOS facilities, but those who wish to accept EFTPOS payments must enter an agreement with one of the many (originally seven) merchant service providers, which rent an EFTPOS terminal to the merchant. The EFTPOS system in Australia is managed by Eftpos Payments Australia Ltd, which also sets the EFTPOS interchange fee. For credit cards to be accepted by a merchant a separate agreement must be entered into with each credit card company, each of which has its own flexible merchant fee rate. Eftpos machines for merchants are provided by larger banks and specialists such as Live eftpos.

The clearing arrangements for EFTPOS are managed by Australian Payments Clearing Association (APCA). The system for ATM and EFTPOS interchanges is called Issuers and Acquirers Community (formerly Consumer Electronic Clearing System; CECS) also called CS3. CECS required authorisations from the Australian Competition & Consumer Commission (ACCC), which was obtained in 2001 and reaffirmed in 2009. ATM and EFTPOS clearances are the made under individual bilateral arrangements between the institutions involved.

Debit cards
Australian financial institutions provide their customers with a plastic card, which can be used as a debit card or as an ATM card, and sometimes as a credit card. The card merely provides the means by which a customer's linked bank or other accounts can be accessed using an EFTPOS terminal or ATM. These cards can also be used on some vending machines and other automatic payment mechanisms, such as ticket vending machines.

Each Australian bank has given a different name to its debit cards, such as:
 Commonwealth Bank: Keycard
 Westpac: Handycard
 National Australia Bank: FlexiCard
 ANZ Bank: Access card
 Bendigo Bank: Easy Money card
St George/Bank of Melbourne/BankSA: FreedomCard
Qudos Bank, Queensland Police Credit Union, Dnister and Indue sponsored financial institutions: Cue Card
People’s Choice Credit Union, Bank Australia, Credit Union SA, Beyond Bank, Teachers Mutual Bank, Nexus Mutual, and Cuscal sponsored financial institutions: rediCARD
Suncorp Bank: eftpos Card
Regional Australia Bank: Access card

Some banks offer alternative debit card facilities to their customers using the Visa or MasterCard clearance system. For example, St George Bank offers a Visa Debit Card, as does the National Australia Bank. The main difference with regular debit cards is that these cards can be used outside Australia where the respective credit card is accepted.

Those merchants that enter the EFTPOS payment system must accept debit cards issued by any Australian bank, and some also accept various credit cards and other cards. Some merchants set minimum transaction amounts for EFTPOS transactions, which can be different for debit and credit card transactions. Some merchants impose a surcharge on the use of EFTPOS. These can vary between merchants and on the type of card being used, and generally are not imposed on debit card transactions, and widely not on MasterCard and Visa credit card transactions.

A feature of a debit card is that an EFTPOS transaction will only be accepted if there is an available credit balance in the bank cheque or savings account linked to the card.

Australian debit cards normally cannot be used outside Australia.  They can only be used outside Australia if they carry the MasterCard/Maestro/Cirrus or Visa/Plus or other similar logos, in which case the non-Australian transaction will be processed through those transaction systems. Similarly, non-Australian debit and credit cards can only be used at Australian EFTPOS terminals or ATMs if they have these logos or the MasterCard or Visa logos. Diners Club and/or American Express cards will be accepted only if the merchant has an agreement with those card companies, or increasingly if the merchant has modern alternative payment options available for those cards, such as through PayPal. The Discover Card is accepted in Australia as a Diners Club card.

In addition, credit card companies issue prepaid cards which act like generic gift cards, which are anonymous and not linked to any bank accounts. These cards are accepted by merchants who accept credit cards and are processed through the EFTPOS terminal in the same way as credit cards.

Cash out
A number of merchants permit customers using a debit card to withdraw cash as part of the EFTPOS transaction. In Australia, this facility (known as debit card cashback in many other countries) is known as "cash out". For the merchant, cash out is a way of reducing their net cash takings, saving on banking of cash. There is no additional cost to the merchant in providing cash out because banks charge a merchant a debit card transaction fee per EFTPOS transaction, and not on the transaction value. Cash out is a facility provided by the merchant, and not the bank, so the merchant can limit or vary how much cash can be withdrawn at a time, or suspend the facility at any time. When available, cash out is convenient for the customer, who can bypass having to visit a bank branch or ATM. Cash out is also cheaper for the customer, since only one bank transaction is involved. For people in some remote areas, cash out may be the only way they can withdraw cash from their personal accounts.  However, most merchants who provide the facility set a relatively low limit on cash out, generally $50, and some also charge for the service. Some merchants in Australia only allow cash out with the purchase of goods; other merchants allow cash out whether or not customers buy any goods. Cash out is not available in association with credit card sales because on credit card transactions the merchant is charged a percentage commission based on the transaction value, and also because cash withdrawals are treated differently from purchase transactions by the credit card company. (However, though inconsistent with a merchant's agreement with each credit card company, the merchant may treat a cash withdrawal as part of an ordinary credit card sale.)

Cardholder verification
EFTPOS transactions involving a debit, credit or prepaid card are primarily authenticated via the entry of a personal identification number (PIN) at the point of sale. Historically, these transactions were authenticated by the merchant using the cardholder's signature, as signed on their receipt. However, merchants had become increasingly lax in enforcing this verification, resulting in an increase in fraud. Australian banks have since deployed chip and PIN technology using the global EMV card standard; as of 1 August 2014, Australian merchants no longer accept signatures on transactions by domestic customers at point of sale terminals.

As a further security measure, if a user enters an incorrect PIN three times, the card may be locked out of EFTPOS and require reactivation over the phone or at a bank branch. In the case of an ATM, the card will not be returned, and the cardholder will need to visit the branch to retrieve the card, or request a new card to be issued.

All debit cards now have a magnetic stripe on which is encoded the card's service codes, consisting of three-digit values.  These codes are used to convey instructions to merchant terminals on how a card should be processed. The first digit indicates if a card can be used internationally or is valid for domestic use only. It is also used to signal if the card is chip-enabled. The second digit indicates if the transaction must be sent online for authorisation always or if transactions that are below floor limit can take place without authorisation.  The third digit is used to indicate the preferred card verification method (e.g., PIN) and the environment where the card can be used (e.g., at point of sale only). Merchant terminals are required to recognise and act on service codes or send all transactions for online authorisation.

Contactless smart card
In the late 2000s, MasterCard and Visa introduced contactless smart debit cards under the brand names MasterCard PayPass and Visa payWave. These payments are made using either electronic payment networks separate from the regular EFTPOS payment networks, or newer EFTPOS with tap sensors, and is an alternative to the previous swipe or chip systems. These networks are operated by MasterCard and Visa, and not by the banks as is the EFTPOS network, through EFTPOS Payments Australia Limited (ePAL).

These cards are based on EMV technology and contain a RFID chip and antenna loop embedded in the plastic of the card. To pay using this system, a customer passes the card within 4 cm of a reader at a merchant checkout. Using this method, for transactions under a specified limit, the customer does not need to authenticate his or her identity by PIN entry or signature, as on a regular EFTPOS machine. For transactions over the above limit, PIN verification is required.

The facility is only available for cards branded with the MasterCard PayPass or Visa payWave logos, indicating that they have the system-permitted embedded chip. ANZ launched an ATM solution based on Visa payWave in 2015, where the customer taps the card on a reader installed at the ATM and inserts their PIN to finalise cash withdrawals. Since 2018, these ATMs work with Apple Pay and Google Pay as well, where a customer taps their NFC-enabled phone instead of their card. Bank debit cards and other credit cards do not currently offer a contactless payment facility. ePAL is developing a contactless payment system for debit cards based on EMV technology as well as an extension of debit cards for use for on-line transactions, and a mobile payment system. Using contactless debit cards on tap-and-go terminals routes the transaction through the more expensive credit card system instead of the EFTPOS route, adding to the cost to the merchant, and ultimately the consumer.

History 
The name and logo for EFTPOS in Australia were originally owned by Shiyombo Makasa and were trade marks from 1986 until 1991. The ownership was for convenience and all the banks used the name and logo (commonly called "fat-E") on their cards and advertising.

In 1991, dialup EFTPOS was conceived by Key Corp (John Wood) and deployment of dialup commenced in 1993. Until 1993, communications, connections and transactions between banks, ATM banks and EFTPOS devices where conducted via leased lines (a specific power assisted communication line that detects any attempt to tamper with it) but in 1993, mobile wireless EFTPOS was conceived by Dynamic Data Systems (H. Daniel Elbaum). In 1995, Dynamic Data Systems and the banking industry worked together to implement, certify and introduce protocols and standards for cellular networks, and by 1998, the use of mobile EFTPOS began to appear in Australia.

In 2006, Commonwealth Bank and MasterCard ran a six-month trial of the contactless smart card system PayPass in Sydney and Wollongong, 
supplementing the traditional EFTPOS swipe or chip system. The system was rolled out across Australia in 2009; other systems being rolled out are Westpac Bank's MasterCard PayPass and Visa payWave branded cards.

In April 2009, a company, “EFTPOS Payments Australia Ltd” (ePal) was formed to manage and promote the EFTPOS system in Australia.  ePal regulation commenced in January 2011. The initial members of EFTPOS Payments Australia Ltd were:
 Australia & New Zealand Banking Group
 Australian Settlements Limited
 Bank of Queensland
 Bendigo & Adelaide Bank
 Cashcard
 Citigroup
 Commonwealth Bank
 Coles Group
 Cuscal
 Indue
 National Australia Bank
 Suncorp-Metway
 Westpac
 Woolworths

 The current members of EFTPOS Payments Australia Ltd are:
 Adyen
 Australia & New Zealand Banking Group
 Australian Settlements Limited
 Bank of Queensland
 Bendigo & Adelaide Bank
 Citigroup
 Commonwealth Bank
 Coles Group
 Cuscal
 EFTEX
 First Data Network Australia
 Indue
 ING Australia
 National Australia Bank
 PayPal
 Suncorp-Metway
 Tyro Payments
 Westpac
 Woolworths

In Australia, store cards have been excluded from participation in the EFTPOS and ATM systems. Consequently, several larger store accounts have entered into co-branding arrangements with credit card networks for the store-based accounts to be widely accepted. This was the case with Coles (previously, Coles-Myer) which co-branded with MasterCard, Myer which co-branded with Visa, and David Jones which co-branded with American Express. Woolworths organised its credit card called Everyday Rewards (now Woolworths Money) which initially was partnered with credit provider HSBC Bank, but changed on 26 October 2014 to Macquarie Bank.

Usage 
As of June 2018, there were 961,247 EFTPOS terminals in Australia and 30,940 ATMs. Of the terminals, over 60,000 offered cash withdrawals. In 2010, 183 million transactions, worth A$12 billion, were made using Australian EFTPOS terminals per month.

In 2011, these figures increased to 750,000 terminals, with 325,000 individual businesses, processing over 2 billion transactions with combined value of approximately $131 billion for the year.

Network 
The EFT network in Australia is made up of seven proprietary networks in which peers have interchange agreements, making an effective single network. A merchant who wishes to accept EFTPOS payments must enter an agreement with one of the seven merchant service providers, which rent the terminal to the merchant. All the merchant's EFTPOS transactions are processed through one of these gateways. Some of these peers are:
 Australia & New Zealand Banking Group
 Commonwealth Bank
 National Australia Bank
 Westpac
 Cuscal
 First Data Network Australia (formerly Cashcard)
 Other

Other organisations may have peering agreements with the one or more of the central peers.

The network uses the AS 2805 protocol, which is closely related to ISO 8583.

New Zealand

EFTPOS is highly popular in New Zealand. The system is operated by two providers, Paymark Limited (formerly Electronic Transaction Services Limited) which processes 75% of all electronic transactions in New Zealand, and EFTPOS New Zealand. Although the term eftpos is popularly used to describe the system, EFTPOS is a trademark of EFTPOS New Zealand, the smaller of the two providers. Both providers run an interconnected financial network that allows the processing of not only of debit cards at point of sale terminals but also credit cards and charge cards.

History 

The Bank of New Zealand introduced EFTPOS to New Zealand in 1984 through a pilot scheme with petrol stations.

In 1989 the system was officially launched and two providers owned by the major banks now run the system. The larger of the two providers, Paymark Limited (formerly Electronic Transaction Services Limited), is owned by French company Ingenico, following its sale in 2018  by ASB Bank, Westpac, Bank of New Zealand and ANZ Bank New Zealand (formerly ANZ National Bank). The second is operated by EFTPOS New Zealand, which is fully owned by VeriFone Systems, following its sale by ANZ New Zealand in December 2012.

1995 was the first deployment of cellular Eftpos in NZ, by Dynamic Data Systems.

During July 2006 the five billionth EFTPOS payment was processed, and at the start of 2012 the 10 billionth transaction was processed.

Usage 
EFTPOS is highly popular in New Zealand, and being used for about 60% of all retail transactions. In 2009, there were 200 EFTPOS transactions per person.

Paymark process over 900 million transactions (worth over NZ$48 billion) yearly. More than 75,000 merchants and over 110,000 EFTPOS terminals are connected to Paymark.

Singapore
In Singapore, NETS was founded in 1985 by a consortium of the country's local banks of DBS Bank, OCBC Bank and United Overseas Bank (UOB) to establish the debit network and drive the adoption of electronic payments in Singapore.

History
NETS was officially launched on 18 January 1986, allowing millions of ATM card holders in Singapore to make transactions through the initial network of 195 terminals located in various retail outlets and by 1993, consumer spending through NETS reached S$1.14 billion.

Usage
The nationwide acceptance infrastructure is the largest in Singapore and includes 54,000 Unified Point-of-Sale (Unified POS) terminals and 94,000 QR acceptance points. In 2011, NETS’ debit system was designated as national payment system by the Monetary Authority of Singapore (MAS).

See also 
 Interac
 Maestro
 NETS
 Visa Debit
 ACCC v Cabcharge Australia Ltd
 Cabcharge

References

External links

Debit cards
Financial services companies of Australia
Financial services companies of New Zealand
Financial services companies of Singapore
Interbank networks
Payment systems
Point of sale companies
American inventions
1981 introductions